Henry Stephen Peploski, nicknamed "Pep", was a former professional baseball player who was an infielder in the Major Leagues in 1929. He played for the Boston Braves and is recognized as one of four Major Leaguers born in Poland, along with Moe Drabowsky, Nap Kloza, and Johnny Reder.

References

External links

1905 births
1982 deaths
Boston Braves players
Major League Baseball infielders
Major League Baseball players from Poland
Polish baseball players
Polish emigrants to the United States